The Molasses Keys are a small group of islands in the Florida Keys. Just a quarter mile south of the Seven Mile Bridge, 4 miles west of Marathon, and a mile and a half east of Money Key,
it is a frequented boating and camping spot. There are four islands, three are always above water, two of which are able to be walked on. The largest and easternmost one is 90% full of vegetation, the second largest one is just southwest and has more of a beach. The third one is an area of rocks always above water just west of the second island. The fourth "island" is an outcropping of rocks and sand visible at low tide just south of the largest island. There is a shallow grass and rock bed to the south of the islands.

In the middle of the two main islands, there is a deeper narrow channel. The north end has a sandbar about 500 feet to the north.  Also between the second and third island there is an access point which is a deep channel. The islands are frequented by boaters, campers, and fishermen because of the sandbars and Seven Mile Bridge channel.

References 

Islands of Monroe County, Florida
Islands of the Florida Keys
Islands of Florida